Christopher Clarey is an American journalist who is a global sports columnist and tennis writer for The New York Times. He is also a regular contributor to ESPN.

Early life 
He was born in Newport, Rhode Island, the son of Roberta “Bonnie” Clarey and Rear Admiral Stephen Clarey. He received a B.A. in English and History at Williams College in Massachusetts in 1986.

Career 
Clarey began his journalism career at The San Diego Union-Tribune where he covered a variety of sports and the Los Angeles Chargers, but left the newspaper in 1991 to become a freelance reporter and was a commentator for the pan-European sports broadcaster Eurosport.

He secured his first byline in The New York Times in 1991 after his former editor at the Union-Tribune recommended to the Times sports editor to commission Clarey to write a story on Paul and Isabelle Duchesnay, a French brother-sister pair of ice dancers.

Clarey was appointed chief sports correspondent at the International Herald Tribune in 1998.

He has written three books: Davis Cup by NEC: The Year in Tennis 1997; Davis Cup Yearbook 1999: The Year in Tennis and The Master

Awards 
Alan Trengove Award for Excellence in Tennis Journalism (2017)
 Eugene L. Scott Award from the International Tennis Hall of Fame (2018)

References 

Living people
People from Newport, Rhode Island
Williams College alumni
The New York Times sportswriters
American sportswriters
American sports journalists
Year of birth missing (living people)
American newspaper journalists